The 2016 Bretagne Classic Ouest–France was the 80th edition of the former GP Ouest–France road bicycle race, now known as the Bretagne Classic. The race took place on 28 August 2016.

Teams 
The eighteen UCI World Tour teams are automatically entitled and obliged to start the race. The race organisation will still hand out a few wildcards to some UCI Professional Continental teams.

Race report

Result

References 

2016
2016 UCI World Tour
2016 in French sport
August 2016 sports events in France